Mary James  may refer to:

Mary James (educator) (born 1946), Associate Director of Research at the University of Cambridge
Mary James (scientist), American physicist
Mary-Dulany James (born 1960), U.S. politician in Maryland
Mary Dagworthy James (1810–1883), hymn writer (also went by Mary Yard James)
 Mary James, a pen name for author Marijane Meaker, who writes books for young children
HMS Mary James, two ships of the Royal Navy have borne the name HMS Mary James